WEXM may refer to:

 WPVR-LP, a low-power radio station (101.3 FM) licensed to serve Mt. Airy, North Carolina, United States, which held the call sign WEXM-LP from 2014 to 2016
 WIBC (FM), a radio station (93.1 FM) licensed to serve Indianapolis, Indiana, United States, which held the call sign WEXM in 2007